Crenides or Krenides may refer to:
Crenides (Bithynia), a town of ancient Bithynia, now in Turkey
Crenides (Macedonia), a town of ancient Macedonia, Greece
Crenides (Thrace), a town of ancient Thrace, now in Turkey